David Davie Shelby (October 24, 1847 – August 22, 1914) was a United States circuit judge of the United States Court of Appeals for the Fifth Circuit and the United States Circuit Courts for the Fifth Circuit.

Education and career

Born in Madison County, Alabama, Shelby was the son of Dr. David Shelby, and grandson of one-time Republic of Texas Supreme Court justice Anthony B. Shelby. He attended Cumberland University and read law to enter the bar in 1870. He was a soldier in the Confederate States Army during the American Civil War. Owing to his youth he was not regularly enlisted in the Confederate Army, but served four months with the 4th Alabama Cavalry Regiment, in a Georgia campaign. He entered private practice in Huntsville, Alabama from 1870 to 1899, serving as city attorney of Huntsville beginning in 1874. Shelby served as a member of Alabama Senate from 1882 to 1884.

Federal judicial service

Shelby was nominated by President William McKinley on February 21, 1899, to the United States Court of Appeals for the Fifth Circuit and the United States Circuit Courts for the Fifth Circuit, to a new joint seat authorized by 30 Stat. 803. He was confirmed by the United States Senate on March 2, 1899, and received his commission the same day. On December 31, 1911, the Circuit Courts were abolished and he thereafter served only on the Court of Appeals. His service terminated on August 22, 1914, due to his death in Huntsville.

References

Sources
 

1847 births
1914 deaths
Judges of the United States Court of Appeals for the Fifth Circuit
United States federal judges appointed by William McKinley
Confederate States Army soldiers
19th-century American politicians
United States federal judges admitted to the practice of law by reading law